Miguel Mejía is a leftist Dominican politician and secretary general of the Izquierda Unida (Dominican Republic). In government, he was formerly a Minister without portfolio, then Minister for Regional Integration.

Mejía was closely associated with Venezuela's Hugo Chávez, and in the period following Chavez' death made several controversial press statements - including in one interview accusing the USA of plotting a coup- and declaring that Hugo Chávez never forgave Hipólito Mejía for having let the Dominican Republic become, in his view, involved in attempts to destabilize the Chavez government.

References

Dominican Republic politicians
Living people
Year of birth missing (living people)